For the Summer Olympics, there are 15 venues that have been used for tennis. This counts separately the two different venues of the All England Lawn Tennis and Croquet Club at Wimbledon:  The original Worple Road venue (now used by Wimbledon High School) was used for the 1908 Summer Olympics; the current Church Road venue, opened in 1922, was used for the 2012 Summer Olympics.  (Each venue was also used that year for the Wimbledon Championships.)

Gallery

References

Ten
Venues